The Awana Skyway, also referred to as the new Awana Skyway (ca. 2016), is a gondola lift system connecting Awana Transport Hub, Chin Swee Temple and SkyAvenue in Genting Highlands, Pahang, Malaysia since December 2016. The Awana Transport Hub terminus consists of the new Awana Bus Terminal, the station building and a new 8-storey car park while the other terminus is located at SkyAvenue.

The Awana Skyway is one of the two aerial lines serving Genting Highlands, with the Genting Skyway serving as an alternate route. The gondola lift system was launched in 2016, and it replaces the former 2-car aerial tramway system running between 1977 and 2014. The gondola lift system can carry up to 3,600 passengers per hour with 10 passengers per gondola. At the maximum speed of 6 metres per second (21.6 km/h), the 2.8-kilometre journey up the mountain peak takes about 10 minutes, though it varies on the weather conditions.

Aerial tramway-based (Old, 1977) 

The old cable car uses a jig-back system: A large electric motor is located at the bottom of the tramway so that it effectively pulls one cabin down, using that cabin's weight to help pull the other cabin up. A similar system of cables is used in a funicular railway. The two-passenger cabins are situated at opposite ends of the loops of cable. Thus, while one is coming up, the other is going down the mountain, and they pass each other midway on the cable span. It ceased its operations since 1 April 2014 to make way for the construction of an all-new mono cable gondola system similar to the one used on Genting Skyway by Leitner Ropeways.

Gondola lift-based (New, 2016) 
The new mono cable gondola lift built by Leitner Ropeways uses 60 mm diameter solid cable wire ropes as opposed to Genting Skyway's 54 mm diameter solid cable wire ropes. Likewise, they are among the strongest mono cable gondola installations in the world. Similarly, it is equipped with high-tech electronic equipment and was built in accordance with stringent Swiss regulations. It also has a double safety circuit which is completely independent.

The foundation used for the pylons is of the "Hang-dug Caisson" type. Each pylon is founded on four Caissons measuring 1.2 metres in diameter, socketed down to bedrock. The average depth of the Caissons is about 40 m (135 feet) and each group of four Caissons piles can take a vertical load of 4,000 tonnes against the maximum vertical load of 150 tonnes from the cable car system. The Caissons method is about the safest and strongest foundation in existence, designed specifically for hilly terrain. Each pylon is accessible via rescue tracks on the ground, whilst each gondola is equipped with radio communication equipment from the stations. The new gondola lift spans on 22 pylons as opposed to the former 5 towers.

See also
 Genting Skyway - Gondola lift type
 Langkawi Cable Car - Gondola lift type
 Penang Hill Railway - Funicular type
 Rail transport in Malaysia

References

External links

 
 The historical ride to Genting Highlands Resort
 Awana Skyway bids farewell after 40 years in operation
 New cable car system to be built in Genting Highlands
 A Groovy Goodbye to Awana Skyway

1977 establishments in Malaysia
Genting Highlands
Gondola lifts in Malaysia